Brachylophosaurus (  or  ; meaning "short-crested lizard", Greek brachys = short + lophos = crest + sauros = lizard, referring to its small crest) was a mid-sized member of the hadrosaurid family of dinosaurs. It is known from several skeletons and bonebed material from the Judith River Formation of Montana, the Wahweap Formation of Utah and the Oldman Formation of Alberta, living about 81-76.7 million years ago.

Discovery and later finds
 

Brachylophosaurus was first named and described by Charles Mortram Sternberg in 1953 for a skull and partial skeleton, holotype NMC 8893, which he had found in 1936 near Steveville in Alberta, and which was at first thought to belong to Gryposaurus (or Kritosaurus as it was known at the time). The type species is Brachylophosaurus canadensis. The generic name is derived from Greek βραχύς, brachys, "short", and λόφος, lophos, "crest of a helmet". The specific name refers to the provenance from Canada. Later, it was recognised that specimen FMNH PR 862, a partial skull discovered in 1922, could also be referred to B. canadensis. The type specimen was uncovered in a layer of the middle Oldman Formation dating from about 78 million years ago.

The holotype remained the only described and recognised specimen of the genus until the 1980s, when Jack Horner described a second species, Brachylophosaurus goodwini, in 1988. The specific name honours preparator and collector Mark Goodwin. This species was based on a partial skull and skeleton, specimen UCMP 130139 found in the Judith River Formation of Montana, at the Skull Crest. However, in 2005 a study by Albert Prieto-Márquez concluded that the perceived differences between the two species were either due to individual variation or the result of UCMP 130139 having been reconstructed with an upside down skull crest. B. goodwini would have been a junior synonym of B. canadensis.

A further Canadian find was specimen TMP 1990.104.0001, a partial skeleton with skull in 1990 discovered at Milk River in Alberta and collected by Tyrrell staffer Darren Tanke and crew. Brachylophosaurus has subsequently become better known from fossils found in Montana than Alberta, however, despite its specific name canadensis. These include specimens MOR 720, a braincase; MOR 794, a very complete skeleton with skull of an adult individual; and MOR 940, another braincase. Near Malta, Montana an entire bonebed of Brachylophosaurus fossils has been uncovered containing over eight hundred specimens, that have been catalogued under number MOR 1071. 

In 1994 at Malta in Phillips County, amateur paleontologist Nate Murphy discovered a complete and uncrushed Brachylophosaurus skeleton which he nicknamed "Elvis". Subsequently, even more informative finds were made by Murphy and his team from the Judith River Dinosaur Institute. On 20 July 2000, specimen JRF 115H or "Leonardo", a fully articulated and partially "mummified" skeleton of a subadult Brachylophosaurus, was discovered by Dan Stephenson. It is considered one of the most spectacular dinosaur finds ever, and was included in the Guinness Book of World Records. They subsequently excavated "Roberta", an almost complete gracile skeleton, and "Peanut", a partially preserved juvenile with some skin impressions. "Peanut" was discovered in 2002 by Robert E. Buresh and is on display at the Institute in Malta, MT. In May 2008, Steven Cowan, public-relations coordinator at the Houston Museum of Natural Science, discovered a Brachylophosaurus skeleton subsequently dubbed "Marco" from the same area as Leonardo.

Description

Size and general build

Brachylophosaurus is notable for its bony crest, which forms a horizontally flat, paddle-like plate over the top of the rear skull. Some, depending on their age, had crests that covered nearly the entire skull roof, while others had shorter, narrower crests. Some researchers suggest it was used for pushing contests, but it may not have been strong enough for this. Other notable features are a relatively small head, the unusually long lower arms and the beak of the upper jaw being wider than other hadrosaurs of that time.

Apart from the above, Brachylophosaurus was a typical hadrosaur which reached an adult length of at least . Like other hadrosaurs, Brachylophosaurus had features like cheeks to keep fodder in the mouth and dental batteries with hundreds of stacked teeth. These teeth could be used to chew efficiently, a feature rare among reptiles, but common among some cerapodan ornithischian dinosaurs like Brachylophosaurus.

Distinguishing traits
 
In 2015, Jack Horner established some distinguishing traits. Two of these are autapomorphies, unique derived characters. The crest formed by the nasal bones is flat and paddle-shaped in adult individuals and largely or totally overhangs the supratemporal fenestrae. The rear edge of the prefrontal bone overgrowths the frontal bone and more to the rear is oriented inwards and downwards to support the base of the crest and contribute to the edge of the supratemporal fenestra. Additionally, there is one trait that is not unique in itself but forms a unique combination with the two autapomorphies: the front branch of the lacrimal bone is extremely elongated and with its tip only touches the maxillary bone.

Skeleton
 
The head of Brachylophosaurus is elongated. It is wide at the rear and very narrow along most of the length of the snout. The upper beak however, abruptly widens at its rear edge, forming a broad bone core for a horn sheath. The nostrils are extremely large and between them the nasal bones form a narrow tall bone wall on top of much of the snout. More to behind the nasal bones stretch out horizontally, creating a flat tongue-shaped skull crest that overgrowths and ultimately overhangs, most of the skull roof. The crest is not hollow but consists of massive bone. The crest has a low longitudinal ridge on the midline.

The maxilla, the tooth-bearing upper jaw bone, is rather elongated in front. Its tooth positions increase during the lifetime of the animal, ranging from thirty-three in younger individuals to forty-eight in the holotype specimen. The teeth are stacked in a tooth battery, with up to three teeth per position. The battery forms a sharp cutting edge, bending inwards, with one or sometimes two teeth per position contributing to the attrition surface. More to behind, the lower jugal bones and quadrate bones flare out sidewards, so that the skull is much wider at its rear lower edges than at the top surface, resulting in a trapezium-shaped profile in posterior view.

Soft tissues

Several so-called "mummies" provide information about the soft tissues of Brachylophosaurus. These "mummies" actually consist of natural casts formed in moulds in the stone matrix surrounding the skeleton, preserving the outline of the body and showing skin imprints. The best studied "mummy" has been "Leonardo", a specimen 90% of the cast surface of which is covered by imprints. Generally, the surface is close to the bones, which could be caused by desiccation before burial or the compressive action of the covering sediment. An exception is the region around the right shoulder, which shows the profile of about six centimetres thick muscles. "Leonardo" also indicates that the base of the neck was heavily muscled and that the soft tissue upper neck profile was placed in an elevated position, running much higher than was usually reconstructed in drawings which tended to follow the curvature of the vertebral column, and filling much of the bend between the front back and the head.

On the snout, the remains of a broad keratinous beak are visible. The skin impressions show many folds and a structure of small polygonal scales. On the back a midline frill formed by triangular or hatchet-shaped projections is present. These seem to be individually separated and are placed as extensions of each neural spine of the vertebral column. The second, third and fourth finger of the hand are contained in a shared soft tissue "mitten".

Examination of the stomach of "Leonardo" also reveals that the dinosaur was parasitized by small, needle-like worms covered in fine bristles. The discovery indicates that other dinosaur species might have been hosts of similar parasites.

Classification
The following cladogram of hadrosaurid relationships was published in 2013 by Alberto Prieto-Márquez et al.:

Paleobiology
 
In 2003, evidence of tumors, including hemangiomas, desmoplastic fibroma, metastatic cancer, and osteoblastoma was discovered in fossilized Brachylophosaurus skeletons. Rothschild et al. tested dinosaur vertebrae for tumors using computerized tomography and fluoroscope screening. Several other hadrosaurids, including Edmontosaurus, Gilmoreosaurus, and Bactrosaurus, also tested positive. Although more than 10,000 fossils were examined in this manner, the tumors were limited to Brachylophosaurus and closely related genera. The tumors may have been caused by environmental factors or genetic propensity.

Diet
A 2008 study conducted on the famous dinosaur mummy Leonardo found that Brachylophosaurus had a diet that consisted of leaves, conifers, ferns, and flowering plants like magnolias. The study also found that Brachylophosaurus was a generalist herbivore; being both a browser and a grazer, but it did more of the former rather than the latter due to the contents found in its stomach.

Paleoecology
Some of the less common hadrosaurs in the Dinosaur Park Formation of Dinosaur Provincial Park like Brachylophosaurus may represent the remains of individuals who died while migrating through the region. They might also have had a more upland habitat where they may have nested or fed.

See also
 Timeline of hadrosaur research

Most Closely Related animals
 Maiasaura
 Acristavus
 Wulagasaurus(?)
 Probrachylophosaurus

References

External links

The Judith River Dinosaur Institute
Brachylophosaurus from SkeletalDrawing.com

Late Cretaceous dinosaurs of North America
Saurolophines
Fossil taxa described in 1953
Taxa named by Charles Mortram Sternberg
Oldman fauna
Paleontology in Montana
Paleontology in Alberta
Campanian genus first appearances
Campanian genus extinctions
Ornithischian genera